Scrap Iron is a 1921 American silent drama film directed by Charles Ray and starring Ray, Lydia Knott and Vera Steadman.

Cast
 Charles Ray as John Steel
 Lydia Knott as John's Mother
 Vera Steadman as 	Midge Flannigann
 Tom Wilson as Bill Dugan
 Tom O'Brien as 	Battling Burke
 Stanton Heck as Big Tim Riley
 Charles Wheelock as Matt Brady
 Claude Berkeley as John's Chum

References

Bibliography
 Connelly, Robert B. The Silents: Silent Feature Films, 1910-36, Volume 40, Issue 2. December Press, 1998.
 Munden, Kenneth White. The American Film Institute Catalog of Motion Pictures Produced in the United States, Part 1. University of California Press, 1997.

External links

 

1921 films
1921 drama films
1920s English-language films
American silent feature films
Silent American drama films
Films directed by Charles Ray
American black-and-white films
First National Pictures films
1920s American films
English-language drama films